Domes built in the 16th, 17th, and 18th centuries relied primarily on empirical techniques and oral traditions rather than the architectural treatises of the time, but the study of dome structures changed radically due to developments in mathematics and the study of statics. Analytical approaches were developed and the ideal shape for a dome was debated, but these approaches were often considered too theoretical to be used in construction.

The Gothic ribbed vault was displaced with a combination of dome and barrel vaults in the Renaissance style throughout the sixteenth century. The use of lantern towers, or timburios, which hid dome profiles on the exterior declined in Italy as the use of windowed drums beneath domes increased, which introduced new structural difficulties. The spread of domes in this style outside of Italy began with central Europe, although there was often a stylistic delay of a century or two. Use of the oval dome spread quickly through Italy, Spain, France, and central Europe and would become characteristic of Counter-Reformation architecture in the Baroque style. 

Multi-story spires with truncated bulbous cupolas supporting smaller cupolas or crowns were used at the top of important sixteenth-century spires, beginning in the Netherlands. Traditional Orthodox church domes were used in hundreds of Orthodox and Uniate wooden churches in the seventeenth and eighteenth centuries and Tatar wooden mosques in Poland were domed central plan structures with adjacent minarets. The fully developed onion dome was prominent in Prague by the middle of the sixteenth century and appeared widely on royal residences. Bulbous domes became popular in central and southern Germany and in Austria in the seventeenth and eighteenth centuries, and influenced those in Poland and Eastern Europe in the Baroque period. However, many bulbous domes in the larger cities of eastern Europe were replaced during the second half of the eighteenth century in favor of hemispherical or stilted cupolas in the French or Italian styles.

Only a few examples of domed churches from the 16th century survive from the Spanish colonization of Mexico. An anti-seismic technique for building called quincha was adapted from local Peruvian practice for domes and became universally adopted along the Peruvian coast. A similar lightweight technique was used in eastern Sicily after earthquakes struck in the seventeenth and eighteenth centuries.

Although never very popular in domestic settings, domes were used in a number of 18th century homes built in the Neoclassical style. In the United States, small cupolas were used to distinguish public buildings from private residences. After a domed design was chosen for the national capitol, several states added prominent domes to their assembly buildings.

Developments 

The construction of domes in the sixteenth and seventeenth centuries relied primarily on empirical techniques and oral traditions rather than the architectural treatises of the times, which avoided practical details. This was adequate for domes up to medium size, with diameters in the range of 12 to 20 meters. Materials were considered homogeneous and rigid, with compression taken into account and elasticity ignored. The weight of materials and the size of the dome were the key references. Lateral tensions in a dome were counteracted with horizontal rings of iron, stone, or wood incorporated into the structure. Other techniques used to reduce lateral thrust were to add a buttress at the base, a counterweight above the abutment, or to give the vault a steeper profile. Architects followed authoritative opinions, especially those of ancient authors, and the evidence from ancient and contemporary buildings. The structural behavior of previous domed buildings acted as full-scale models to inform new ones and small scale models of new projects were also relied upon. Traditional geometric rules of proportion for domes were applied by master builders regardless of size, but helped new domes be built in forms known to be safe. 

Onion-shaped domes appeared widely on royal residences in the middle of the sixteenth century. In addition to those on the eastern part of Prague Castle, royal residences in Madrid, London, Vienna, and Kraków had them, always as part of Italian classical forms. 

The first rotating observatory dome was built in the sixteenth century, in Kassel.

The publication of Sebastiano Serlio's treatise, one of the most popular architectural treatises ever published, was responsible for the spread of the oval in late Renaissance and Baroque architecture. Book I (1545), on geometry, included techniques to create ovals, and Book V (1547), on architecture, included a design for an oval church. Churches with oval plans begin to be built in the middle of the sixteenth century. Churches with oval domes allowed for a synthesis of the two fundamental church types, longitudinal and central plan, and would become characteristic of Baroque architecture and the Counter-Reformation. 

Toward the end of the sixteenth century, transepts with domes were popular in several Italian states and were featured in prominent churches such as  the Abbey of Santa Giustina in Padua (begun in 1532), Mantua Cathedral (added after 1540), Church of the Gesù in Rome (1568–1580), and San Giorgio Maggiore in Venice (begun in 1566). The domes of the Abbey of Sants Giustina in Padua may have been inspired by those of il Santo.

In the sixteenth and seventeenth centuries, many Renaissance and Baroque elliptical and oval plan domes were built over rectangular naves, using brick in Italy and stone in Spain. Later German oval domes in the Rococo style used different combinations of geometry. Elliptical dome traces were published by Durero (1525), Serlio (1545), and De L'Orme (1561) along with practical methods of achieving the shape using circular arcs, the technique used from the time of the ancient Romans. Alonso de Vandelvira published a description of the geometry of oval domes around 1580 with orthogonal projections of meridian and parallel rib curves. Oval domes often incorporated both elliptical and oval or semicircular curves and this ambiguity is reflected in the architectural literature. Builders relied on graphical or empirical solutions to such geometric problems. In 1640, mathematician Paul Guldin established that the "elongated semicircle" of traditional practice is an ellipse.

A treatise by Vincenzo Scamozzi from 1615 gives examples of a typology of vaults and domes, but not a general and thorough theory. Although some recommendations for the profile of a dome can be found in treatises from earlier centuries, the traditional geometric and proportional techniques for masonry domes and lanterns were first detailed in 1694 by Carlo Fontana in his famous treatise Il Tempio Vaticano e sua Origine. The treatise by Guarino Guarini, published posthumously in 1737, included the way to draw various vaults, but not how to build them. Building on Fontana's work, Bernardo Antonio Vittone published Istruzioni elementari dell’architettura civile in 1760, in which he recommended using ogival or ellipsoidal profiles to increase the proportional height of domes and increasing the angle at which they intersected with their lanterns, for both structural and aesthetic reasons. To counter the negative impact this raised profile has on the interior appearance, domes with two or three layers of vaults were built, with openings in the lower levels to admit light.

Over the course of the seventeenth and eighteenth centuries, developments in mathematics and the study of statics led to a more precise formalization of the ideas of the traditional constructive practices of arches and vaults, and there was a diffusion of studies on what was considered the most stable form for these structures: the catenary curve. In 1704, James Bernoulli wrote that an inverted catenary arch of any thickness will resist its own weight, which likely inspired Pierre Bouguer to conclude in his Mémoire sur le lignes courbes qui sont propres à former les voûtes en dômes (1734) that the optimal dome shape was a rotated inverted semi-catenary.

Analytical approaches were also being developed and debated in the eighteenth century, particularly between French and Italian mathematicians and architects, but were considered too theoretical to be used in construction. The study of dome structures changed radically, with domes being considered as a composition of smaller elements, each subject to mathematical and mechanical laws and easier to analyse individually, rather than being considered as whole units unto themselves. In 1734, mathematician Pierre Bouguer (and later others) argued that the dome could be thought of as sliced into a series of independent wedged-shaped segments meeting as arches. Therefore, a dome as a whole was stable if each constituent arch was stable and analysis of a dome could be performed the same way as analysis of an arch. He published his Mémoire in 1736, "the first treatise on the theory of the dome", with possible stable forms for domes when ignoring friction. A. F. Frézier built on this work and used a method of analyzing the thrust of domes as a made of a series of masonry arch elements that could then be compared to the known thrust behavior of barrel vaults of the same span.

Sixteenth century

Italian Renaissance 

A combination of barrel vaults, pendentives, drum, and dome developed as the characteristic structural forms of large Renaissance churches following a period of innovation in the later fifteenth century. Florence was the first Italian city to develop the new style, followed by Rome, and then Venice. Domes in the renaissance style in Florence are mostly from the early period, in the fifteenth century. Cities within Florence's zone of influence, such as Genoa, Milan, and Turin, mainly produced examples later, from the sixteenth century on.

Papal States

The Tempietto in Rome, a small domed building modelled on the Temple of Vesta, was built in 1502 by Bramante in the cloister of San Pietro in Montorio to commemorate the site of St. Peter's martyrdom. It has inspired numerous copies and adaptations since, including Radcliffe Camera, the mausoleum at Castle Howard, and the domes of St. Peter's Basilica, St Paul's Cathedral, the Panthéon, and the U.S. Capitol. 

Bramante's 1505–6 projects for a wholly new St. Peter's Basilica mark the beginning of the displacement of the Gothic ribbed vault with the combination of dome and barrel vault, which proceeded throughout the sixteenth century. Bramante's studies for new church designs for St. Peter's coincided with Leonardo da Vinci's studies of centrally planned churches while they were both at the court of Ludovico Sforza in Milan and they may have collaborated. Their studies may have influenced many of the centrally planned churches built in the first half of the sixteenth century, such as the church of Santa Maria della Consolazione (started around 1508) and the church of the Madonna di San Biagio at Montepulciano (1518-1545). Although Bramante designed a low dome like that of the Pantheon for the church of Santa Maria della Consolazione in Todi, a building ordered by the ruling Atti family to mark the site of a 1508 miracle, the design changed in 1587 to a dome and drum on pendentives.

The first church with an oval dome in the Renaissance period was the Sant'Andrea in Via Flaminia, built from 1550 to 1554 by Vignola. Use of the oval dome subsequently spread quickly through Italy, Spain, France, and central Europe. The church of Sant'Anna dei Palafrenieri (c. 1568–1575), designed by Vignola and completed by his son Giacinto Barozzi, was the first church to have an oval dome over an oval plan. 

Many Italian examples of oval domes have semi-circular cross sections, which allowed for easier construction using semi-circular transverse centering. Vignola's oval plan church of Sant'Anna dei Palafrenieri was the first to be built within Rome, and was designed in 1572 with seven windows between the eight ribs in its oval dome. The windows introduced structural complications that Vignola had avoided in his first oval dome over the rectangular plan church of Sant'Andrea in Via Flaminia, but the restrictions of the site necessitated light from above. The oval plan church of San Giacomo degli Incurabili was started in 1592 by a student of Vignola's, Francesco Capriani, and finished by Carlo Maderno. It also has ribs between the six windows in its dome, but they are concealed on the interior. The design of this church would inspire others over the next two centuries, aided by the building activity of the many new religious orders founded between 1524 and 1621.

St. Peter's Basilica

Bramante's initial design for the rebuilding of St. Peter's Basilica was for a Greek cross plan with a large central hemispherical dome and four smaller domes around it in a quincunx pattern. Work began in 1506 and continued under a succession of builders over the next 120 years. Bramante's project for St. Peter's marks the beginning of the displacement of the Gothic ribbed vault with the combination of dome and barrel vault. Proposed inspirations for Bramante's plan have ranged from some sketches of Leonardo da Vinci to the Byzantine quincunx church and the dome of Milan's Basilica of San Lorenzo. Bramante is said to have likened his design to placing the Pantheon on top of the Basilica of Constantine. He completed the four massive central piers and the arches linking them by 1512, but cracking in the arches was detected between 1514 and 1534, possibly due to settling. The two eastern piers rest on solid marl and clay, while the other two rest upon remains of earlier Roman construction. That the piers and arches were left to stand with incomplete buttressing while construction stopped for over 30 years was also a factor.

Michelangelo inherited the project to design the dome of St. Peter's basilica in 1546. It had previously been in the hands of Bramante (with Giuliano da Sangallo and Fra Giovanni Giocondo) until 1514, Raphael Sanzio (assisted by Giuliano da Sangallo and Fra Giovanni Giocondo) until 1520, and Antonio da Sangallo the Younger (with Baldassare Peruzzi), whose work was disrupted by the sack of Rome in 1527. The design had been altered by Giuliano da Sangallo from being hemispherical to being 9 meters taller, segmental, and ribbed, and he had strengthened the piers and completed building the pendentives. 

Michelangelo redesigned the dome to have two shells, a mostly brick internal structure, and three iron chains to resist outward pressure. His dome was a lower, hemispherical design. He further strengthened the piers by eliminating niches in them and the internal spiral staircase. Michelangelo obtained a decree from Pope Julius III that threatened an interdiction against anyone who altered his design, completed construction of the base for the drum by May 1558, and spent November 1558 to December 1561 creating a detailed wooden model. Construction of the drum was completed a few months after he died in 1564. Sixteen pairs of columns project out between sixteen windows in the drum to act as buttresses, and are aligned with the sixteen ribs of the dome and the paired columns of the lantern. An artist and sculptor, rather than an engineer, Michelangelo did not create full engineering plans for the dome and his model lacked construction details. The dome of St. Peter's basilica was later built by Giacomo della Porta and Domenico Fontana.

Pope Sixtus V appointed Giacomo della Porta and Domenico Fontana in 1588 to begin construction of the dome of St. Peter's Basilica to Michelangelo's model. They made modifications to his design estimated to have reduced the tensile stresses in the dome by 40%, including thinning the two shells near the top, reducing the thickness and exterior projection of the ribs, raising the springing line by 4.8 meters, and changing the shape of the dome. Giacomo della Porta insisted on a vertically elliptical profile for the dome of St. Peter's Basilica, for structural reasons, and construction began in June 1588. The dome was completed up to the base of the lantern in May 1590, a few months before the death of Pope Sixtus V. The lantern and lead covering for the dome were completed later, with the brass orb and cross being raised in 1592.

The lantern is 17 meters high and the dome is 136.57 meters from the base to the top of the cross. The ogival dome was built with 16 ribs and an inner diameter of 42.7 meters. It begins above the drum and attico (the decorative strip above the drum), which are about 18 meters tall. The two shells of the dome are brick and each about 1.19 meters thick at the base of the dome. Because the shells separate from each other as they rise, the dome is 2.7 meters thick overall. The sixteen ribs connect the two shells together and are made of stone. 

Carlo Maderno's extended nave for St. Peter's Basilica, built between 1609 and 1614, included bays covered by oval domes with lanterns.

Cracks in the dome were noticed as early at 1603, when the mosaics covering the dome interior were completed, and additional cracks were recorded after 1631 and in 1742, demonstrating progression. Five more tie rings were added around the dome in 1743-44 by Luigi Vanvitelli. The iron chains included in the design to contain the dome's lateral thrust have had to be replaced ten times since it was constructed. Giovanni Poleni's 1748 report on the state of the dome, written in response to observed cracking, anticipated the safe theorem by stating "explicitly that the stability of a structure can be established unequivocally if it can be shown that the thrust line lies completely within the masonry." His observation of cracks in the outer shell by the ribs has more recently been attributed by computer models to the heavy lantern.

Republic of Venice

In Venice, there is evident Byzantine influence in the line of three domes over the nave and crossing of the church of San Salvador, built between 1506 and 1534 by Giorgio Pietro Spavento and Tullio Lombardo. 

The Villa Capra, also known as "La Rotunda", was built by Andrea Palladio from 1565 to 1569 near Vicenza. Its highly symmetrical square plan centers on a circular room covered by a dome, and it would prove highly influential on the Georgian architects of 18th century England, architects in Russia, and architects in America, Thomas Jefferson among them. Commissioned by count and churchman Paolo Almerico, Palladio designed a dome for the residence because he believed that the Latin meaning of "domus" being "house" indicated that ancient Roman houses were domed.

Palladio's two domed churches in Venice are Il Redentore (1577–92) and San Giorgio Maggiore (1565–1610), the former built in thanksgiving for the end of a bad outbreak of plague in the city. Inspired by these churches, the two-domed church of Santa Maria della Salute by Baldassare Longhena was built on the edge of Venice's Grand Canal from 1631 to 1681 to celebrate the end of a plague in the city in 1630. The larger dome is 130 feet tall over an octagonal nave for public ceremonies and the smaller dome covers the choir used by the clergy for official celebrations. The architect attributed the shape of the domed church to a crown evoked by the dedication of the church to Mary, Queen of Heaven.

Republic of Florence

The Medici Chapel in Florence was designed by Michelangelo and built between 1521 and 1534. It contains the tombs of Giuliano and Lorenzo de' Medici. In 1569, the dome over the church of Madonna dell'Umiltà in Pistoia was completed by Giorgio Vasari at the behest of Cosimo I de' Medici, over a building designed and built by others. Although clearly referencing Florence Cathedral visually and in the use of two shells, structurally the octagonal dome is similar to the much earlier dome of Florence Baptistery and the hemispherical shape of Michelangelo's design for the dome of St. Peter's Basilica. Cracks discovered shortly after completion necessitated the addition by Vasari of iron chains on the inside and outside, but structural problems have continued and additional chains have been added over the centuries, many outside of the dome. The instability has been attributed to Vasari's design.

House of Habsburg and the Holy Roman Empire

Habsburg Netherlands

In the fifteenth century, pilgrimages to and flourishing trade relations with the Near East had exposed the Low Countries of northwest Europe to the use of bulbous domes in the architecture of the Orient and they were adopted in the architecture of the Netherlands. In Ghent, an octagonal staircase tower for the Church of St. Martin d'Ackerghem, built in the beginning of the sixteenth century, had a bulbous cupola similar to a Syrian minaret. These cupolas were made of wood covered with copper, as were the examples over turrets and towers in the Netherlands at the end of the fifteenth century, many of which have been lost. The earliest example from the Netherlands that has survived is the bulbous cupola built in 1511 over the town hall of Middelburg. Multi-story spires with truncated bulbous cupolas supporting smaller cupolas or crowns became popular in the following decades. The onion shape was used at the top of important sixteenth-century spires such as the Onze Lieve Vrouw Kerk in Haarlem, the 1566 Oude Kerk in Amsterdam, and the 1599 cheese market of Alkmaar.

Kingdom of the Germans

In the early sixteenth century, the lantern of the Italian dome had spread to Germany as a wood and copper cupola called the welsche Haube ("Italian hood") and this structure gradually adopted the bulbous cupola from the Netherlands. The first such example was on the tower of the town hall of Emden (1574–76) and other early examples were on the town halls of Brzeg, Silesia (1570–76), Rothenburg ob der Tauber (1572–78), and Lemgo (c. 1589).  

This type blended into German rural architecture such that, in Bavaria, bulbous domes less resemble Dutch models than Russian ones. The polygonal domes on the towers of the Frauenkirche in Munich from about 1530 and the hexagonal domes of the town hall of Augsburg from 1615 are examples. Domes like these gained in popularity in central and southern Germany and in Austria in the seventeenth and eighteenth centuries, particularly in the Baroque style. Dresden in particular has outstanding examples, including the lantern over the large central dome of the Dresden Frauenkirche (1726–39). A château in Dresden with a tower dome from 1535 was remodeled from 1547 to 1557 to have a series of bell-shaped domes, according to a wooden model.

Prague
In Prague, the welsche Haube was apparently little used, but the fully developed onion dome was prominent by the middle of the sixteenth century. The development of the onion shape in Prague architecture may have been an effort to blend Gothic forms with those from Italy, and may also indicate influence from the Netherlands. Drawings published in carpentry manuals and the prestigious association of onion spires with pilgrimage churches encouraged their adoption in the nearby regions of Bavaria, Southern Germany and the Austrian Empire. Drawings of the city of Prague from 1562 and 1606 show towers and spires capped with onion domes.

Duchy of Milan

Milan, between 1550 and 1650, initiated construction of domes for many important churches. Domes in the Lombard region were traditionally hidden externally by lantern towers called timburios, a technique dating from late Antiquity whose structural behavior was well known, but this began to change starting in the 1560s. However, the planned extradoxed dome of San Sebastiano had a timburio added and many domes continued to be planned with timburios from the outset. Examples include the Trivulzio chapel in the church of San Nazaro in Brolo (1547), and the churches of Santa Maria delle Grazie, Santa Maria presso San Celso (started in 1497), Santa Maria della Passione (1549-1550), and San Vittore al Corpo (1568-1573). The use of drums beneath domes began in Milan following the trend in Rome and central Italy. They improved lighting for domes but also introduced additional structural problems.

Habsburg Spain and its colonies

In 1564, a dome on a drum was completed over the vestry of the church of San Miguel in Jerez de la Frontera, a rare Spanish example built before those of El Escorial. The domes over the church and towers of El Escorial, built between 1579 and 1582 as extradoxed domes on drums, became a model for subsequent Spanish domes, particularly after Juan de Herrera's publication of the main dome's cross-section in 1589. The main dome over the church is a stone spherical dome and lantern on a cylindrical drum and has an internal diameter of 18.94 meters. Smaller versions with internal diameters of 6.68 meters top the two church towers. The influence of the dome at El Escorial is evident in domes at the church of the College of Nosa Señora da Antiga in Monforte de Lemos (redesigned after 1592 to be extradoxed and have a drum), Real Colegio Seminario del Corpus Christi in Valencia (altered to include a drum between 1595 and 1597), the church of San Pablo and San Justo in Granada (completed in 1622 with a similar drum), and in the domed tower at the Monastery of Irache. The similarities in the dome over Cerralbo Chapel at Ciudad Rodrigo, which does not have a drum, include the proportions of the dome thickness, the lantern diameter, and the use of horizontal stone courses in the lower portion of the dome up to 32 degrees, rather than radial courses.

During the Spanish colonization of the Americas, from the 16th to the 18th centuries, thousands of churches were built in Mexico. The churches vary, but surviving examples from central Mexico are typically on a latin cross plan with a brick dome on a drum at the crossing. Adobe was widely used in early examples but these buildings were often destroyed by earthquakes or replaced. Thick rib cross-vaulting in a dome-like shape was used in the 16th century. Most churches used a bell-gable instead of a bell tower, although stone bell towers were often added in later centuries, typically topped by a small hemispherical dome. Vaults and domes were usually built with brick and, like towers, were particularly vulnerable to earthquakes. Domes developed vertical cracks from the lateral movement and were more vulnerable than vaults because movement in the drums beneath them could increase the damage. A large amount of movement in a single event or the cumulative effect of multiple earthquakes could result in collapse. Only a few examples from the 16th century survive. The Cathedral of Mérida in Yucatán, Mexico, was the first cathedral finished on the American continent and contains a domed trellis vault with a grid of ribs by Juan Miguel de Agüero that is dated to 1598.

 Tratado de Arquitectura, from around 1580, is the first Spanish scientific treatise and contains the first recorded definitions of the geometry of meridian and parallel ribs for six kinds of oval domes. It is evidence of the scientific and cultural exchange occurring with Italy in the late sixteenth and early seventeenth centuries. Early oval domes built in Spain in the second half of the sixteenth century include the crossing dome of the cathedral of Cordoba and the chapter house dome of Seville Cathedral. The dome of San Sebastian in Alcaraz, Spain, was completed in 1592 and is said to have been designed by Andrés de Vandelvira before his death. It uses a lattice vault design with a grid of stone structural ribs. The caissons are filled in with lighter or smaller blocks of stone.

Polish–Lithuanian Commonwealth

The spread of the Renaissance style dome outside of Italy began with central Europe. Although there was often a stylistic delay of a century or two, Poland has a number of important examples, such as the Polish Sigismund's Chapel in Kraków (1517–1533). As elements likely associated with Roman Catholic church buildings at this time, the use of domed transepts outside Italy may indicate partiality towards Roman Catholicism over Protestantism. Examples include a church in Dąbrowa Zielona (1554), a Jesuit church in Nieśwież (1586–1599), and a Jesuit church in Kraków. Early examples in Gdańsk, such as the tower of the town hall (1561) and the tower of the church of St. Catherine (1634), show Dutch and possibly Russian influence. 

In Poland, Orthodox and Greek Catholic churches maintained the forms developed during the Middle Ages, such as Greek cross plans or longitudinal plans in three parts with each part covered by a dome, but with updated styling.

Seventeenth century

Spanish Habsburgs

Giuseppe Nuvolo built the church of San Carlo all'Arena around 1626 in Naples, the first of several oval plan churches that would be built there until the middle of the eighteenth century.

In Milan, proposals for the dome of San Lorenzo (built in 1619) included versions both with and without timburios, although, along with the quincunx plan Church of Sant'Alessandro, the building had the more difficult supporting structure of four main arches between four free-standing pillars. A dome for Sant'Alessandro was built in 1626 and demolished in 1627, perhaps due to the use of an inadequate number of iron ties. Although the dome had a timburio, it may also have had a lower and less stable hemispherical form. Autographed drawings from the period indicate it was a ribbed hemispherical dome with a lantern and timburio. Deep cracks in the arches supporting the dome caused the completed dome to be demolished, along with the supporting arches in February 1627. In 1629, the supporting piers were enlarged and the four round arches were strengthened with iron reinforcement and by adding pointed arches above them. An outbreak of disease stopped work in 1630 and the dome was not completed until 1693, with an extrados shape.

Saint Peter's Abbey in Ghent was rebuilt in 1629, having been destroyed in the Protestant uprising that began in the Netherlands in 1568, a part of the Eighty Years' War. The church was rebuilt in an Italian Baroque style with one of the first church domes in the Southern Netherlands, just after the completion of the domed Basilica of Our Lady of Scherpenheuvel, and seems to have been intended to convey a counter-reformation message.

In Spain, false vaults made of wood or reed and covered with plaster were used in the seventeenth century. The technique, dating from the medieval period, was applied to chapel domes to give the appearance of stone construction. The dome of Seville's  (begun 1659) used stucco to create high-relief scrolling foliage patterns like those of Islamic arabesque ornament. In Granada, stuccowork was introduced by Francisco Hurtado Izquierdo and used to embellish classical forms in the dome (c. 1702) and sacristy dome (c. 1713–42) of La Cartuja, in contrast to earlier vaults such as that of San Jerónimo (1523–43), which used diagonal ribs in an idiosyncratic way and had apparent Moorish influences. 

In Lima, the "City of Kings", capital of Spain's Viceroyalty of Peru, frequent earthquakes prompted the use of quincha construction for the vaulting of the church of San Francisco (1657-74) by Constantino de Vasconcelos and Manuel de Escobar. Quincha was an adaptation of an indigenous wattle and daub technique and consisted of a wooden structural framework filled out with cane or bamboo and covered with plaster and stucco to resemble stone. The anti-seismic properties of this light and elastic system allowed the 36.9 foot wide double-shell dome of the church, a hemisphere and lantern resting directly on pendentives, to survive for more than three hundred years and it became universally adopted along the Peruvian coast. Another 17th century example is the dome of the church of Santo Domingo in Lima (1678-81).

A lightweight dome made with a wooden frame, woven reeds, and plastered with a gypsum mortar was built over Messina Cathedral in Sicily in 1682. Known to react better than masonry vaulting to earthquakes, this technique was also more expensive due to the need for specialized artisans and the use of white poplar wood in the structure, which unlike traditional wooden formwork could not be re-used and was rare on the island. It was used in eastern Sicily after earthquakes struck in 1693 and 1727.

Austrian Habsburgs and the Holy Roman Empire

The Augsburg Town Hall (1615-1620), designed by Lutheran architect Elias Holl, included two towers topped by onion domes and these became part of the city's civic identity by the later seventeenth century.

Oval domes can also be found in the Amalienburg pavilion at Schloss Nymphenburg, Munich. 

Onion spires are predominant in Bavarian country churches, such as those on the three towers of the 1688  near Waldsassen by Abraham Leuthner and Georg Dientzenhofer, who had both worked in Prague. In other examples, such as the onion dome on the tower of St. Ulrich's and St. Afra's Abbey (1602), the influences are less clear. 

German and Austrian influence resulted in many bulbous cupolas in Poland and Eastern Europe in the Baroque period, and rural church towers in the Austrian and Bavarian Alps still feature them. Onion-shaped spires can be found in rural and pilgrimage churches in southern Germany, northeastern Italy, the former Czechoslovakia, Austria, and some of Poland, Hungary, and the former Yugoslavia. 

The four years he spent in Paris may have influenced the emphasis on forced perspective and optical effects in his domes, in contrast to the more formalistic architectural design of Rome at that time. He used form, color, and light to give the illusion of greater height in his centralized domed churches. His dome over the Chapel of the Holy Shroud (1667–90) in Turin is supported by six stacked hexagonal layers of six arches each, arranged such that each layer of arches spring from the peaks of the arches in the layer below them. Although the layers form a cone leading to the base of the dome, each is made progressively smaller to exaggerate the appearance of height. The dome itself is a lighter color than the lower levels of the church, also making it appear even farther away. The ribs in San Lorenzo and Il Sidone were shaped as catenary curves.

The idea of a large oculus in a solid dome revealing a second dome originated with Guarini. He established the oval dome as a reconciliation of the longitudinal plan church favored by the liturgy of the Counter-Reformation and the centralized plan favored by idealists. Guarini's drawings, including isometric intersections of spheres, barrel vaults, and oval domes as well as drawings explaining construction and ceiling patterns, were published posthumously in the Architettura Civile and influenced the designs of Hildebrandt, the Dientzenhofers, and Balthasar Neumann in Central Europe. With the newly developed mathematics of calculus, these experimental designs could be proven and would become the foundation of Rococo spatial arrangements.

Polish–Lithuanian Commonwealth

In Poland, polygonal buildings and earlier medieval towers were often capped with domes in the Renaissance or Baroque styles. The Renaissance domes were generally onion domes stacked on top of one another and separated with so-called lanterns of openwork arcades. An example is the tower at the Basilica of the Holy Trinity in Chełmża. The Baroque domes were characterized by unusual shapes and curves, such as those of Gniezno Cathedral. However, many bulbous domes in the larger cities of eastern Europe were replaced during the second half of the eighteenth century in favor of hemispherical or stilted cupolas in the French or Italian styles.

In the Polish–Lithuanian Commonwealth, Roman Catholic churches with Greek-cross plans and monumental domes designed by Tylman van Gameren became popular in the last quarter of the seventeenth century. Examples include St. Kazimierz Church (1689-95) and the Church of St. Anthony of Padua, Czerniaków (1690-92). The traditional Orthodox church design in three parts, with a dome over each, was used in hundreds of Orthodox and Uniate wooden churches in the seventeenth and eighteenth centuries. Tatar wooden mosques in Poland were domed central plan structures with adjacent minarets.

Duchy of Parma

The church of Santa Maria del Quartiere in Parma, Italy, was built with a hexagonal dome. The dome has been strengthened with a system of encircling tie rods.

Papal States

Oval plan churches spread outside of Rome following Vignola's innovation with the church of Santa Anna dei Palafrenieri. Giovan Battista Aleotti built both  in Argenta and San Carlo Borromeo in Ferrara between 1609 and 1621. The oval plans synthesize longitudinal and central plan church layouts, allowing clear views of the altar from all points.

Francesco Borromini's dome of San Carlo alle Quattro Fontane (1638–41) has a novel oval plan that approximates an ellipse using four circular arcs based on the vertices of two large equilateral triangles; a complex geometrical coffer pattern of crosses, octagons, and lozenges is repeated eight times on the dome's inner surface. Because the dome uses a pattern of coffers that get smaller as they approach the oculus and because it is lit from both above and below, the dome appears lighter and higher than it would otherwise. The church inaugurated the high baroque style in Rome. A copy based on plans provided by Borromini was built as the church of Madonna del Prato in Gubbio.

Borromini's masterpiece is the dome of Sant'Ivo alla Sapienza (1642–50), built for Pope Urban at a University in Rome. The ribbed dome has a unique and complex geometry with a large window in each of it six lobes and stucco ornamentation. The style of using ribs in a dome over a coffered background was first expressed over the small chapel of Filippo Neri in the church of Santa Maria in Vallicella (1647-1651), modified by Pietro da Cortona to have small oval windows at its base. Cortona also revised the dome of Santa Maria della Pace (1656-1659) to have a stepped feature on the exterior, evocative of the Pantheon, and stucco ribs over octagonal coffers on the dome's interior. The domes of Santi Luca e Martina (begun 1634) and San Carlo al Corso (1668), both about 14 meters wide with an oval vertical profile, were entirely designed by Cortona.

The oval plan church of Sant'Andrea al Quirinale (1658–61) by Bernini is unusual in that the entrance is on the minor axis and it is often depicted as unique in this respect, but the later churches of Santi Celso e Giuliano (1735) and Santissimo Nome di Maria (1736) also have this layout. Bernini's Sant'Andrea al Quirinale is known as the oval Pantheon. 

Work on the Cathedral of Santa Margherita in Montefiascone, halted at the level of the drum due to lack of funds, was resumed after a 1670 fire destroyed the temporary wooden roof and damaged the interior. The stone dome was built by Carlo Fontana with eight ribs connected to each other by horizontal arches to resist outward force. It was completed in 1673 and he defended its proportions in print by both citing the measured proportions of other domes as well as the existing geometrical rules of proportion based on materials and supports.

Kingdom of France

In Paris, the dome of St. Marie de la Visitation was built by François Mansart from 1632 to 1633, who would later design the church of Val-de-Grâce (1645–1710), built to commemorate the birth of Louis XIV. The dome of Val-de-Grâce, however, was designed by Jacques Lemercier after having worked in Rome for seven years. It includes an inscription around the dome relating to the Bourbon kings. Inspired by St. Peter's Basilica, its dome likewise has two shells, but the outer shell is much taller in order to compensate for the foreshortening effect from viewing the exterior dome from nearby on the ground. The inner shell is made of stone and the outer shell is made of wood.

Oval domes can also be found in secular buildings such as the Château de Maisons (1642–6) and the Château de Vaux-le-Vicomte (1657). 

Kingdom of England

The church of St Stephen Walbrook in London was built by Christopher Wren from 1672 to 1677 and its dome has been called "the first classical dome in England".

Eighteenth century

Kingdom of Great Britain

London's Great Fire of 1666, following a devastating outbreak of plague in the city which killed a fifth of its population, spurred the commission of Christopher Wren to rebuild St. Paul's Cathedral, which occurred over the course of 35 years. Robert Hooke, who first articulated that a thin arch was comparable to an inverted hanging chain, may have advised Wren on how to achieve the crossing dome. Wren may also have been informed of the structural problems of the dome of St. Peter's Basilica by John Evelyn, who had examined it, and did not finalize his design for a dome three-quarters its size until shortly before its construction started in 1705.

When finished, the dome had three layers: an inner dome with an oculus, a decorative outer wooden dome covered in lead roofing, and a structural brick cone in between. The brick cone ends in a small dome that supports the cupola and outer roof and the decorated underside of which can be seen through the inner dome's oculus. The structure rises 365 feet (108 m) to the cross at its summit, but is evocative of the much smaller Tempietto by Bramante. The use of the brick cone, in addition to other innovations, allowed the piers beneath the dome to be reduced in size. The thickness of the brick cone is 450 millimeters. The dome is supported by eight piers with a veneer of Portland stone over a core of rubble infill, which were damaged by the added pressure from the dome's construction and needed repairs in 1709. The dome was completed in 1710. Wren's structural system became the standard for large domes well into the 19th century. The iron chains used to encircle the 34-meter-wide dome have since been replaced by stainless steel girdles. Damage to the outer timber truss dome during World War II resulted in the timber being replaced by reinforced concrete.

Although never very popular in domestic settings, domes were used in a number of 18th century homes built in the Neo-Classical style, including the 1720s Chiswick House, in West London. The Palladian mansion Penicuik House, built by Sir James Clerk, included a stable block with a domed dovecote built as a faithful imitation of the destroyed ancient monument Arthur's O'on. The domed mausoleum by Nicholas Hawksmoor at Castle Howard was built in 1742 and is similar to Bramante’s Tempietto. Robert Adam referenced the Roman Pantheon dome in his 1767 design of Luton Hoo in Bedfordshire.

Kingdom of France

Adjacent to a hospital and retirement home for injured war veterans, the royal chapel of Les Invalides in Paris, France, was begun in 1679 and completed in 1708. The dome was one of many inspired by that of St. Peter's Basilica and it is an outstanding example of French Baroque architecture. In 1861 the body of Napoleon Bonaparte was moved from St. Helena to the most prominent location under the dome.

Plans for the Church of St. Genevieve, the patron saint of Paris, were approved in 1757 with a dome 275 feet tall over a Greek cross plan. The architect of the church, Jacques-Germain Soufflot, wanted to surpass the dome of London's St. Paul's Cathedral and, like St. Paul's, the dome consisted of three shells. Unlike St. Paul's, and due to advances in mathematics and engineering, all three shells were built of stone and made a part of a structural system that permitted support by thinner piers and walls.

The Halle aux blés, a circular wheat market in Paris, was completed in 1763 with a timber dome. It would be rebuilt in the nineteenth century in cast iron.

Kingdom of Ireland

The Irish Parliament House in Dublin, designed by Edward Lovett Pearce and built from 1729 to 1739, included an octagonal dome over a central chamber for the House of Commons. The location of the space, especially relative to the barrel-vaulted House of Lords, which was off axis on the east side of the building, seemed to symbolize a political dominance by the House of Commons. The dome's outer shell was 31 feet above its inner shell and reminiscent of the Roman Pantheon and the octagonal dome over Lord Burlington's Chiswick House. The dome was the only exterior indication of the interior arrangement, but its location and height were such that it could not be easily seen. It was rebuilt after a fire in 1792 but demolished after the building was sold to the Bank of Ireland in 1803.

Hapsburg Monarchy and the Holy Roman Empire

Holy Roman Empire

Although the Thirty Years' War delayed the onset of the Baroque style in the areas of the Holy Roman Empire, rebuilding of the many palaces and churches destroyed had begun by the end of the seventeenth century. Johann Bernhard Fischer von Erlach studied architecture in Rome before working in Austria. His Church of the Holy Trinity (begun 1694) in Salzburg has clear influences from Borromini in its use of the color white, accentuated windows, and the elliptical dome and oculus. The oval dome of St. Peter's Church in Vienna (1702–33) is almost exactly the same, although it was designed by Johann Lukas von Hildebrandt. The dome of von Erlach's Karlskirche (1716–24) is also very similar, but with round windows in the dome itself in addition to the windows of the drum and with dark trim at both the base of the drum and the base of the dome.

Guarini's plan for the church of S. Maria Ettinga in Prague inspired a group of buildings built in Bohemia between 1698 and 1710. An abbey church at Obořiště, Bohemia, with two transverse oval vaults in the nave intersecting a third circular dome made to look like an oval, was the first church by Christoph Dientzenhofer to show Guarini's influence. Banz, overseen by Johann Dientzenhofer, has a complex arrangement of overlapping and subdivided transverse oval vaults with wide ribs at their intersections that make it difficult to understand the structural system, like Guarini's earlier church of Santa Maria della Divina Providenza in Lisbon.

Domes by the Asam brothers, such as those of Weingarten Abbey (1715–20) and Weltenburg Abbey (1716-21), blended fresco painting, stucco and, in the case of Weltenburg, indirect lighting to achieve their effects.

Appointed by the King of Savoy as First Architect to the King in 1714, Filippo Juvarra built the Basilica of Superga at Turin between 1717 and 1731. The apparent lightness of its dome may be attributed to both even lighting and the unusual lack of pendentives, with the dome on its circular entablature above eight columns instead. Its use of bulbous domes on the lantern and side towers was also unusual in Italy, where bulbous domes remained rare. The basilica was built as the official dynastic mausoleum of the House of Savoy, which had governed Piedmont and southeast France since the 15th century. The original intended site of the mausoleum, begun in 1596, was found to have problems with uneven settlement due to the soil and this led to a halt in construction. After efforts to compensate for the settlement, and despite the mausoleum at Superga already being built, construction was resumed to complete the original building as the Sanctuary of Vicoforte.

The Sanctuary of Vicoforte's oval dome, very close to an ellipse, was completed in 1731 and is the largest masonry dome of its kind in the world. It measures 37.15 meters by 24.8 meters at its base and is pierced by eight oval windows and a central oval oculus with a cupola. Although iron rings were used as part of the original construction at three levels to hold the dome together, cracks developed as the foundation settled further over the centuries. Additional reinforcement was added from 1985 to 1987 to halt their spread. Oval domes are also found in nearby Liguria, such as the church of San Torpete (1730–33) in Genoa, but the use of stone in this region, rather than the brick predominant in the architecture of Piedmont, limited their size. The style of Piedmont spread to Vienna, where Italian architects built oval-plan churches and inspired the building of others.

Many decades after Guarino Guarini's buildings used them, the crossed-arch dome was revived by Bernardo Vittone in projects such as the Sanctuary of Valinotto (1738–39) and the Chapel of San Luigi Gonzaga.

German Baroque architecture resolved the tension between longitudinal and centralized spaces through the use of ovals. Neumann's more traditional longitudinal churches had domes over their crossings, such as his churches at Münsterschwarzach Abbey (1727–43),  (1730–39),  (1733–45),  (1742-45), and Neresheim Abbey (1745–92). Neumann replaced barrel vaults in basilical plan churches with series of light intersecting elliptical domes. Considered Neumann's masterpiece, the Basilica of the Fourteen Holy Helpers (1743–72) uses a system of intersecting ovals similar to that at Banz Abbey. Unlike Banz, the bands at the intersection of the vaults are modeled in stucco, rather than being structural. The stone and mortar shells of the domed vaulting are reinforced by iron bars, a technique he also used in the 18 meter span domed vault covering the staircase at the Würzburg Residence. It was built in a rural area of Bavaria as a pilgrimage church, as was the Wieskirche, and both in the rococo style.

The two-shell dome of Saint Blaise Abbey in the Black Forest by French architect , with an internal span of 33.7 meters, dates from 1768 and rests on a ring of columns. It has been seen as a "landmark in the transition from Italian to French models in South German architecture" and may have been inspired by the Church of St. Genevieve, although the structural system was controversial. The 15.4 meter wide center of the inner dome dates is a thin membrane structure that dates from 1910-1913.

Austrian monarchy

Because of the imprecision of oval domes in the Rococo period, resting them on drums created problems and the domes instead often rested directly on arches or pendentives. The oval dome of the Trinity church in Bratislava was built between 1717 and 1745. It is very similar to that of St. Peter's Church in Vienna, which the architect, Antonio Galli Bibiena, had briefly worked on, but is decorated instead by painting in the trompe-l'œil technique for which the Bibiena family is known. The dome of Santa Maria Assumpta (c. 1770) in Sabbioneta, also designed by Bibiena, employs a more complex trompe-l'œil effect. A double dome, the inner dome is an open latticework through which the outer dome can be seen, which is painted to appear to be a clear sky.

Its oval dome was decorated in the rococo style popular among the city's elites and it would serve as a model for the church built in the Nadelburg, which was founded by the Habsburgs.

Johann Michael Fischer's abbey church at Rott am Inn (1759–63) has a series of three domical vaults over its nave, with the largest in the center over an octagonal space and painted with an illusionistic fresco by Matthias Günther.

The dome of the Basilica of Sant'Andrea, Mantua, was added to the 15th century church by Filippo Juvarra between 1733 and 1765.

It is a false dome 20.5 meters long and 13.2 meters wide and made of a series of parallel wooden arches hidden with planks and stucco on the inside surface. Unlike similar work elsewhere in Italy, it is self-supporting and unconnected to the earlier truss roof above it. The oval domes of the church of the Addolorata at Niscemi was based on designs by Gagliardi and the 1755 vault over the church of San Giuseppe in Syracuse by Carmelo Bonaiuto is also related. The dome over the crossing of  four ribs springing from the centers of it supporting arches and is also a self-supporting false vault made of wood covered in plaster.

Russian Empire

During the reign of Catherine the Great, Scottish architect Charles Cameron designed the Pavlovsk Palace (1781-1786) after Palladio's Villa Rotonda.

Spanish Empire

Viceroyalty of Peru

Quincha domes following the 17th century model of the Church of San Francesco in Lima were built in the capital and elsewhere, such as the dome over the imperial staircase of the Mercedarian main cloister that was rebuilt between 1759 and 1762. Other 18th century examples include the dome of the church of San Francisco in Trujillo (rebuilt after 1759) and the dome of the camarín of the church of La Merced in Lima (1774).

Viceroyalty of New Granada

In Quito, Ecuador, La Iglesia de la Compañía de Jesús was built about 100 km away from an active fault line. The dome was built with adobe-concrete and tiles. Although the cruciform arrangement of the church allows it to withstand some horizontal force, the materials used were chosen for their resistance to compression only and the earthquakes it has experienced have required many repairs.

United States

In the United States, most public buildings in the late 18th century were only distinguishable from private residences because they featured cupolas, such as that of the Maryland State House or the smaller, and more typical, example over the Old State House of Delaware. Maryland State House in Annapolis was rebuilt in the 1770s with a pointed octagonal dome designed in 1772, the first over an American state house. The dome was covered with copper sheeting. Annapolis served as the capital of the country for ten months beginning in 1783, during which time George Washington resigned his military commission and Congress formally approved the Treaty of Paris, ending the American Revolutionary War. This dome, which leaked and was criticized as "inadequate, unimpressive, and too small for the building" and constructed "contrary to the rules of architecture", was replaced with the taller present design after 1784. The present dome was made of wood held together with wooden pegs and the exterior was completed by 1788; the interior was completed by 1797. The dome is similar to that of the Schlossturm in Karlsruhe, Germany. It is topped with an original lightning rod to Benjamin Franklin's design, supported by a surrounding copper and gold acorn and pedestal. 

The design for the national capitol building approved by George Washington included a dome modeled on the Pantheon but the design was subsequently revised and construction did not begin until 1822. Several states added prominent domes to their assembly buildings as a result of the choice for the national capitol, and completed them before the national capitol dome was finished. The Massachusetts State House, built in the decade after the Maryland State House dome, included a dome after it was decided that the national capitol building would have one. The dome is not visible from the interior of the building. The wooden exterior of the dome was initially painted white, then covered in canvas painted to resemble lead roofing with a gilded pinecone finial. The entire dome was later gilded.

Thomas Jefferson's Monticello, begun in the 1770s, had the first dome to be built on an American home. The octagonal saucer dome with skylight oculus was built with curved wooden ribs made of four layers of short overlapping curved planks joined together with iron nails. Wooden purlins braced the ribs in two horizontal rings. The dome was completed after 1796. The inspiration for Jefferson's dome seems to have been the similar octagonal dome at Wrotham Park designed in 1754 by Isaac Ware, which has since been removed, rather than the octagonal dome at Chiswick House. Wrotham Park's dome was also positioned directly behind a portico, used round windows, and covered a space that did not extend down to the ground floor.

See also
 History of early and simple domes
 History of modern period domes

References

Bibliography

 
 
 
 
 
 
 
 
 
 
 
 
 
 
 
 
 
 
 	
 
 
 
 
 
 
 
 
 
 
 
 
 
 
 
 
 
 
 
 
 
 
 
 
 
 
 
 
 
 
 

 
 
 
 
 
 
 
 
 
 
 
 
 
 
 
 
 
 
 
 
 
 
 
 
 
 
 
 
  Proceedings of the 6th International Congress on Construction History (6ICCH 2018), July 9-13, 2018, Brussels, Belgium.
 
 
 
 
 
 

Domes
Arches and vaults
Architectural elements
Church architecture
Mosque architecture
Baroque architectural features
Ceilings
Roofs